Oxychilus navarricus, before 2002 known as Oxychilus helveticus (Blum, 1881), is a species of small air-breathing land snail, a terrestrial pulmonate gastropod mollusk in the family Oxychilidae, the glass snails.

Description
For terms see gastropod shell.

The 4.5-6 x 7-13 mm shell is thin and a light horny yellowish colour. It is whitish near the umbilicus and very shiny, almost smooth. The outline is almost globulous. There are 4.5-6 weakly convex whorls with weak suture. The last whorl width is 1.5 x or less of the preceding whorl which is well rounded at lower side. The umbilicus is not very wide, 1/8-1/7 of diameter. Genitalia: internal ornamentation of proximal penis consisting of more than seven longitudinal pleats, sometimes straight and distinct, sometimes wavy, slender and connected by lateral projections giving a reticulate appearance.

Distribution
This species is known to occur in a number of countries and islands including:
 Great Britain
 Ireland
 The Netherlands 
 Switzerland
 Canada - introduced 
 and other areas

References

External links 
 Oxychilus navarricus at AnimalBase taxonomy, short description, distribution, biology,status (threats), images

Oxychilus
Gastropods described in 1870